Barisan Nasional Parliamentary Council (abbrev: BNPC) is composed of only Barisan Nasional MPs responsible for holding the Government to account and for developing and disseminating the party's policy positions.

The council is chaired by Ismail Sabri Yaakob, who was selected in July 2018.

Backbenchers Club
The Barisan Nasional Backbenchers Club (commonly referred to as the Backbenchers Club, BNBBC or BBC) is a loose caucus of 108 members of the lower house of the Parliament of Malaysia, the Dewan Rakyat, belonging to the Barisan Nasional (BN) coalition. The term "backbencher" originates from the British Parliament, denoting a Member of Parliament (MP) who is not a member of the Cabinet or is otherwise part of the government through the holding of a post such as Parliamentary Secretary.

Originally the BNBBC was not prominent in parliamentary affairs. However, in 2005, it drew attention when its then chairman, Shahrir Abdul Samad, publicly called for the restoration of the Parliamentary Services Act (PSA) so Parliament could be self-sufficient in conducting its own affairs. The backbenchers supported Shahrir, but little was heard further on after the matter blew over. Then in 2006, Shahrir quit as the BNBBC Chair after not receiving support from the backbenchers in voting for a motion brought by Opposition Leader Lim Kit Siang (DAP-Ipoh Timur). Deputy Chairman Raja Ahmad Zainuddin Raja Omar was appointed the Acting Chair.

After 2008 general election, Bintulu MP Tiong King Sing of the Sarawak Progressive Democratic Party (SPDP) took over as chairman of the BNBBC while Bung Moktar Radin, MP of Kinabatangan took over as deputy chairman.

The BN Backbenchers Club was chaired by Najib Razak, who was selected on 1 November 2020 and disqualified from the position after losing his parliamentary seat on 23 August 2022 upon his admission to the prison.

Since then, the position of BNBBC chairman has been left vacant.

List of Chairmen of BNBBC & BNPC 
Barisan Nasional Backbenchers Club

Barisan Nasional Parliamentary Council

Incumbent Members of Parliament (30)

Members of Parliament of the 15th Malaysian Parliament 

Barisan Nasional has 30 MPs in the Dewan Rakyat, with 26 from UMNO, 2 from MCA, 1 from MIC and 1 from PBRS.

See also
 Shadow Cabinet of Malaysia

Notes and references

External links
 Portal of the Barisan Nasional Parliamentary Council

Opposition of Malaysia
Parliament of Malaysia
Political opposition organizations